The Hujingtou Battle Museum is a museum in Kinmen National Park, Lieyu Township, Kinmen County, Taiwan.

History
During the Chief of the General Staff visit to Lieyu on 19 August 1988, he found out that there was no battle museum in the island. He then instructed the commander of the 158th division to construct the museum. The museum was then constructed and opened on 19 January 1989.

Exhibitions
The museum displays the battle history, observation post and broadcasting station.

See also
 List of museums in Taiwan

References

1989 establishments in Taiwan
Lieyu Township
Military and war museums in Taiwan
Museums established in 1989
Museums in Kinmen County